Irish transport to Barbados dates back to the 1620s, when Irish people began arriving on the island. The majority were emigrants, indentures, and merchants, though with an unknown number of political and convict transportees during the 1650s

History 
The Irish settled in Barbados with the English from the 1620s, as emigrants, merchants, indentured servants and prisoners sold into servitude.

"Indentured servitude appeared in Virginia by 1620. Initially a device used to transport European workers to the New World, over time servitude dwindled as black slavery grew in importance in the British colonies."

Although most Irish immigrants were free or indentured and not slaves, it has been popularly claimed that Cromwell's sale of thousands of military prisoners in the 1650s could be seen as closer to slavery than voluntary indentured immigration. However, this conflation of Irish indentured servants with African chattel slaves, known as the Irish slaves myth, is incorrect and ahistorical. Chattel slavery was a different legal category based on race as codified in The Barbados Slave Code, did not cease after a period of time (usually 7 years for indentured servitude), and stripped those who fell under it entirely of their rights. The writings of Father Antoine Biet made during his visit to Barbados highlight the difference in status, power and autonomy between the groups, beyond the legal separation. In his writings, he recounts the interaction between an Irish indentured overseer and an enslaved Black man, mentioning how the latter was punished by whipping and the removal of one of his ears by the former.

Demography 
Currently, Barbadian descendants of the Irish are called redlegs. This community has been endogamous, and now numbers only about four hundred people. Most live in poverty and are prey to infections and diseases. Often, they have a poor diet and lack of dental care. Furthermore, hemophilia caused diseases and premature deaths in the community, and excess sugar foods consumed by the community has aroused a high rate of diabetes, which has extended blindness among many of them. Moreover, school absenteeism, poor health, the mixture between members of the same family (which causes severe disease in their descendants) and the poverty of the community, reinforced by the possession of small land, shortage of employment opportunities and maintenance of large families (and therefore greater food shortages for each of its members), have adversely affected their presence on the island. Today, redlegs are characterized by anomalies and difficulties to survive on the island.

See also
White Barbadian
Barbadian people
Irish immigration to Saint Kitts and Nevis
Irish people in Jamaica
Irish slaves myth
Redlegs

References

 
Irish Caribbean
Barbados
Ethnic groups in Barbados
European Caribbean
Immigration to Barbados